The Queens Community Board 6 is the local government body in the New York City borough of Queens, encompassing the neighborhoods of Forest Hills and Rego Park. It is delimited by the Horace Harding Expressway to the north, Woodhaven Boulevard to the west, the Jackie Robinson Parkway to the south, and the Grand Central Parkway on the east.

References

External links
Profile of the Community Board

Community boards of Queens